The Old Stone Warehouse in Rochester, New York is an historic warehouse building.  It was built in 1822 and is a four-story, trapezoidal building with six-story addition built of Medina sandstone.  It was built by Myron Holley and is located on the Erie Canal.  During the mid-19th century it was used as a foundry.

It was listed on the National Register of Historic Places in 1973.

References

External links

Commercial buildings in Rochester, New York
Commercial buildings on the National Register of Historic Places in New York (state)
Historic American Buildings Survey in New York (state)
Commercial buildings completed in 1822
National Register of Historic Places in Rochester, New York
1822 establishments in New York (state)